Acraea hecqui is a butterfly in the family Nymphalidae. It is found in the Democratic Republic of the Congo (southern Kivu).

References

Butterflies described in 1981
hecqui
Endemic fauna of the Democratic Republic of the Congo
Butterflies of Africa